Rhian Morgan may refer to:

 in August (1996 film)
Rhian Morgan (singer) with The Morgan Twins